Dadara or Daniel Rozenberg (born 8 February 1969, Łódź, Poland) is a Dutch artist of Polish ancestry known for his flyers, paintings, album covers, statues and performance artwork. Son of renowned computer scientist Grzegorz Rozenberg.

Biography
After finishing high school in 1986, Dadara briefly studied mechanical engineering at the Delft University of Technology, after which he studied at the Free Academy Psychopolis in The Hague, the Academy of Industrial Design in Eindhoven, and the Academy of Visual Design in Genk (Belgium), before graduating from the Willem de Kooning Academy in Rotterdam in 1992. 

After completing studies, Dadara started designing flyers, live-paintings and record covers for the then upcoming international electronic house music scene. This included work for the RoXY club in Amsterdam, Outland Records, and the Mystery Land festival. The public recognition gained through this underground exposure led his paintings to be noticed by the Reflex Modern Art Gallery in Amsterdam, where till today he had ten solo-exhibitions, as well as exhibitions in Paris, Berlin, Stuttgart, Miami and New York City.

Commissions include baby-shaped loudspeakers for B&W, an Absolut Vodka ad, a Greenpeace campaign, invited artist for Expo 2000 in Hannover, and a 70 meters long mural for Leiden University in the Netherlands.

In the past 10 years, Dadara mainly focused on both large interactive art projects and making paintings. The common thread throughout most of these works is that they provide a commentary on contemporary society. Topics include on one hand governmental control, lack of transparency, privacy issues, and regulations, and on the other hand value creation, money, and dreams.

Projects

Greyman
In 1999 Dadara built his first big public sculpture: the 9 meters high Greyman Statue of No Liberty in front of the Rijksmuseum in Amsterdam. This marked the beginning of the production and design of more big public pieces, which over time became more interactive, combining theatrical aspects with the use of multi-media.

Fools ark
In 2002 Dadara built a wooden threemaster, the Fools Ark, which was built during the Over het IJ festival in the old Amsterdam NDSM shipyards, then was used as mainstage for Mystery Land, before crossing the Atlantic Ocean to be burned at the Burning Man festival in Nevada. After its burn the Fools Ark rose like a Phoenix from its ashes to be burnt again on the island of Terschelling during the Oerol festival ('continuing its journey through the clouds, granting wishes and desires to all aboard....').

Footage of the Fools Ark and next year's Grey man project was intertwined into an audio-visual journey through forgotten worlds to tell the tale behind the project, resulting in the part documentary/ part animated movie "Fall and Rise of the Fools Ark".

The music on the DVD Fall and Rise of the Fools ark was composed by Lamb.

Love, Peace, and Terror tank
In 2007 a big pink tank was built on a rooftop in the center of Amsterdam as part of the Love, Peace and Terror project, which was later blown to pieces with explosives in an act of aesthetic visual terrorism.

Checkpoint Dreamyourtopia
During his artist in residence period at CentralTrak in Dallas 2008–2009, Texas, Dadara worked on Checkpoint Dreamyourtopia, a border control checkpoint to enter your own Dreams, which could be experienced in Nevada and Texas before crossing borders itself, after which it was resurrected at the Lowlands Festival and destroyed in Berlin in an old swimming pool, where the walls between dreams and reality were smashed with chainsaws and sledgehammers twenty years after the Berlin Wall came crumbling down.

Exchanghibition Bank and Pool of Plenty
In 2010, Dadara started working on the Pool of Plenty project: a pool filled with millions of money bills, bundled in stacks. A closer look at the pool will reveal that the bills in the pool are not real money, but pieces of aesthetically pleasing art. The pool will be protected by security guards so not one of the bills can be removed. Visitors who do want a bill though, can buy or rather exchange one at a bank initiated by Dadara – the Exchanghibition bank. This bank will take form as a traveling exchange booth. Amsterdam Central Station and Paradiso are two of the pop-up locations. The project links to a dedicated blog about the value of art and money.
In August 2012, the Exchanghibition Bank travelled to Burning Man in the Black Rock Desert of Nevada, an event based on the principle of a gift economy, where no money changes hands. The Exchangibition Bank gifted people a zero banknote in exchange for the signing of a "Spiritual Karma Laundering Contract." The project was featured in Rolling Stone

See also
 Lamb (band)

References

External links
Official Dadara website and blog
Absolut Dadara
Pink peace tank invade Amsterdam skyline on BoingBoing
Love, Peace, and Terror
Checkpoint Dreamyourtopia on Current TV
Checkpoint Dreamyourtopia on I love Berlin
Checkpoint Dreamyourtopia slideshow
Art as Money blog
Exchanghibition bank

1969 births
Living people
Album-cover and concert-poster artists
Contemporary painters
Dutch painters
Dutch male painters
Willem de Kooning Academy alumni